The men's featherweight was a weightlifting event held as part of the Weightlifting at the 1920 Summer Olympics programme. 1920 was the first time weightlifting was divided into weight categories. Featherweight was the lightest category, including weightlifters weighing up to 60 kilograms. A total of 14 weightlifters from 11 nations competed in the event, which was held on 29 August 1920.

Results

References

External links
 
 

Weightlifting at the 1920 Summer Olympics